Serv or SERV may refer to:

 Chrysler SERV, a single-stage to orbit rocket design submitted for the Space Shuttle contest
 Serv (imprint), an imprint of the German group VDM Publishing devoted to the reproduction of Wikipedia content
 SERV (charity), a charity based in England which provides a volunteer medical courier service for local hospitals

See also
 Servs
 Servia (disambiguation)